Dinu C. Giurescu (15 February 1927 – 24 April 2018) was a Romanian historian and politician.

Biography
He was born in Bucharest in 1927, the son of historian Constantin C. Giurescu. After attending the Saint Sava High School, he graduated from the University of Bucharest's Faculty of History in 1950, and obtained his PhD in History from the same university in 1968. That year he became a professor at the Bucharest National University of Arts, where he taught until 1987.

Giurescu emigrated to the United States in 1988, where he published The Razing of Romania's Past, an analysis of the Nicolae Ceaușescu regime's policy toward the country's architectural heritage. He returned from exile in 1990, whereupon he became a corresponding member of the Romanian Academy, and a titular member in 2001. From 1990 to 2011 he was a professor of history at the University of Bucharest. In 2012, he was elected to the Chamber of Deputies for a Bucharest seat, representing the Conservative Party. He died of myocardial infarction at his home in Bucharest in 2018.

Publications

References

1927 births
2018 deaths
20th-century Romanian historians
21st-century Romanian historians
Titular members of the Romanian Academy
Members of the Chamber of Deputies (Romania)
Conservative Party (Romania) politicians
Romanian expatriates in the United States
University of Bucharest alumni
Academic staff of the Bucharest National University of Arts
Saint Sava National College alumni
Politicians from Bucharest